The 1924 municipal election was held December 8, 1924, to elect a mayor and five aldermen to sit on Edmonton City Council and three trustees to sit on each of the public and separate school boards.

There were ten aldermen on city council, but five of the positions were already filled: Ambrose Bury, James McCrie Douglas, Joseph Duggan, James East, and James Findlay were all elected to two-year terms in 1923 and were still in office.

There were seven trustees on the public school board, but four of the positions were already filled: Samuel Barnes, Ralph Bellamy, Frank Crang (SS), and FS McPherson had all been elected to two-year terms in 1923 and were still in office.  The same was true on the separate board, where Robert Crossland (SS), Paul Jenvrin, Thomas Magee, and Joseph Henri Picard were continuing.

The election was conducted using the single transferable vote system.

Voter turnout

There were 9,477 ballots cast out of 22,298 eligible voters, for a voter turnout of 42.5%.

Results

 bold or  indicates elected
 italics indicate incumbent
 "SS", where data is available, indicates candidate living on Edmonton's Southside, important because of the minimum South Side representation instituted after the city of Strathcona, on the south side of the North Saskatchewan River, amalgamated with Edmonton on February 1, 1912.

Mayor

Aldermen

Public school trustees

Because of the single transferable vote system, Roper received more initial votes, but Johnston won based on votes subsequently transferred from other candidates.

Separate (Catholic) school trustees

Because of the single transferable vote system, Esch received more initial votes, but Carrigan won based on votes subsequently transferred from other candidates.

References

Election History, City of Edmonton: Elections and Census Office

1924
1924 elections in Canada
1924 in Alberta